Wasn't Expecting That is the third studio album by English singer-songwriter Jamie Lawson. It was released on 1 April 2011 through Lookout Mountain Records and reached number 11 on the Irish Albums Chart. The album's title track "Wasn't Expecting That" was later included on Lawson's self-titled fourth album in 2015.

Track listing

References

2011 albums
Jamie Lawson (musician) albums